Cradley Heath F.C. was an English association football club based in Cradley Heath in the Black Country.  The club competed in the Birmingham & District League, one of the country's strongest semi-professional leagues, between 1922 and 1961 and won the league championship in the 1925–26, 1930–31 and 1931–32 seasons.  The club also competed in the FA Cup on a regular basis.

A new Cradley Heath F.C. competed briefly in the Midland Football Combination in the 1990s but it had no connection to the original Cradley Heath club.

Notable players
Future England international Jack Rowley played with the club between September and November 1936 on loan from Wolverhampton Wanderers.
Joe Scott both began and ended his playing career with the club; he also appeared (between 1923 and 1930) in the Football League with Rotherham County, Barnsley and Tottenham Hotspur.
Future England international Billy Wright was a player and groundsman for the team during March–April 1938 prior to joining Wolverhampton Wanderers.

References

Defunct football clubs in England
Defunct football clubs in the West Midlands (county)
West Midlands (Regional) League